Wynyard railway station is a heritage-listed underground commuter rail station located in the north-west precinct of the Sydney central business district, in New South Wales, Australia. The station opened on 28 February 1932 to coincide with the opening of the Sydney Harbour Bridge.

History

The station opened on 28 February 1932. Wynyard was originally constructed with six platforms (the existing four platforms are still numbered from 3 to 6), with platforms 1-4 located on the upper level and platforms 5 and 6 on the lower level. The original intention was that Platforms 1 and 2, located adjacent to platforms 3 and 4, would eventually serve the eastern pair of railway tracks across the Harbour Bridge for a proposed railway line to the Northern Beaches. In the interim, with construction yet to begin on the Northern Beaches line due to lack of funds, they were used as a terminus for North Shore tram services on Sydney's tram network, a service that operated over those tracks from the bridge's opening in 1932 until 1958. A feature of these lines was Australia's only underground tram terminus. On 22 January 1956, the lines from platforms 5 and 6 were extended to Circular Quay as part of the City Circle.

Former tram tunnels
Following the closure of the North Shore tram lines, in 1958 the tracks were lifted from platforms 1 and 2. Later, the platforms were walled off from 3 and 4 and part of the space converted into an underground car park for the Menzies Hotel. The tunnels were accessed from Wynyard Lane where a descending ramp was cut west under Wynyard Park to the disused platforms. The car park used both tunnels north from the former platforms to an exit cut in from Cumberland Street just south of Essex Street. The Wynyard Lane Car Park was closed in October 2016 to make way for the mixed-use Wynyard Place development which would obstruct the entrance ramp to the tunnels.

The remainder of the tunnels north of the car park exit were walled off as were the northern portals on the Harbour Bridge.  North of the portals, two additional road lanes were built above the old tramway as part of the Cahill Expressway. The disused tunnels and ramp that formerly connected the station to the eastern tram tracks can still be seen from the pedestrian path along the east side of the bridge, mirroring those still in use to the west of the bridge.

Station configuration

Wynyard station currently has two levels, each with two platforms. The upper level serves the North Shore line, whilst the lower level serves lines traversing the City Circle. Both lines run south under York Street from Wynyard to Town Hall. There is no connection between the rails of these two lines at Wynyard.

The passenger concourse is on an intermediate level between the upper and lower platforms. Wynyard is connected via underground passageways to several surrounding buildings and shopping arcades and is located immediately below Wynyard Park. Direct access via tunnels is possible to George, Hunter and Pitt Streets. Escalators connect the station concourse with York Street (emerging underneath Transport House) and Carrington Street (under Wynyard Park).

Refurbishment

Commencing in 2015, the platforms and concourse were thoroughly refurbished with new flooring and ceilings as well as an extra stairway to platforms 3 and 4 and the addition of more ticket barriers. The four wooden escalators underneath Transport House, which had been operational since the opening of the station, were replaced with modern escalators. Parts of the former escalators were repurposed into a ceiling-mounted artwork titled 'Interloop', which was installed at the York Street entrance to the station concourse. The refurbishment was completed in 2018.

Brookfield Place

Above Wynyard Station, Brookfield Properties has created a mixed-use scheme of offices, retail and leisure in one new block that rises out of the reconfigured transit hall of Wynyard Station. The design team of Make Architects and Architectus assembled four separate sites including the former Menzies Hotel, Thakral House, and the retained Shell House and Beneficial House, and merged them into one reinvigorated block, which has been named Brookfield Place Sydney – a name the developer reserves for their premium international developments. The George and Carrington Street entrances to Wynyard Station have been greatly expanded to allow for greater access to the railway concourse but also to the buildings above and the new retail levels at street level and below. The development provides a new, street level pedestrian route from George Street through to Carrington Street and Wynyard Park beyond.

Wynyard Walk

The Wynyard Walk is a  pedestrian link and tunnel between Wynyard station and Barangaroo that opened in September 2016, with a Clarence Street entrance that opened in December 2016. Based on a design by architecture firm Woods Bagot, the project combined a new entrance, a pedestrian tunnel, a pedestrian bridge, and a new pedestrian plaza. Wynyard Walk provides direct access via tunnels to Clarence, Kent, and Sussex Streets. Wynyard Walk features a huge video screen showcasing digital art.

Platforms and services

Transport links

Wynyard station is served by bus routes operated by Busways, Forest Coach Lines, Hillsbus, Transdev and Transit Systems.

Trackplan

See also

Architecture of Sydney
 List of Sydney railway stations
 Railways in Sydney
 Rail transport in New South Wales
 Sydney underground railways

References

External links

 Wynyard Station at Transport for New South Wales (Archived 10 June 2019)
Wynyard Station Map Transport for NSW

Easy Access railway stations in Sydney
Railway stations located underground in Sydney
Railway stations in Australia opened in 1932
York Street, Sydney
North Shore railway line
City Circle
Bankstown railway line